Anthony Franklin Floyd (born February 1, 1981) was a safety for the Indianapolis Colts. He spent 2006 NFL Europe season with the Berlin Thunder, where he earned All-NFL Europe honors after making four interceptions, tied for second in the league. He spent the 2006 NFL preseason with the Houston Texans before being released at the conclusion of training camp.

Early life

Floyd attended Chaney High School in Youngstown, Ohio, and earned three varsity letters together in football and basketball, and four in track.

References

External links
 Louisville Cardinals bio

1981 births
Living people
Players of American football from Youngstown, Ohio
American football safeties
Louisville Cardinals football players
Berlin Thunder players
Indianapolis Colts players
Columbus Destroyers players
New Orleans VooDoo players